Little Haywood is a village in Staffordshire, England. For population details as taken at the 2011 census see under Colwich. It lies beside a main arterial highway, the A51 (linking the English Midlands with Liverpool) but traffic through the village is mainly light, owing to this bypass. Nearby also is the West Coast Main Line railway, the Trent and Mersey Canal and beside it, the river Trent.

Little Haywood is cited in the Domesday Book of 1086. Although originally a small village, housing expansion during the 1980s has created a commuter village and most of its inhabitants have employment far outside the confines of the Haywood area.

Location
Little Haywood is situated on the side of a hill in the system of valleys drained by the rivers Trent and Sow. It lies near the northern edge of The Chase and is surrounded in the main by farmland. Geologically, the village lies on Triassic sandstone of the Sherwood Sandstone Group, with overlying glacial deposits from the last glaciation of Great Britain.

The village lies within the Stafford borough of Staffordshire and its name is derived from the Old English "haeg wadu," meaning an enclosure in woodland.

Waterways

There are three main waterways running near to Little Haywood: the River Sow, the River Trent and the Trent and Mersey Canal, which was opened in 1777. A wooden footbridge carrying Meadow Lane across the Trent was built in 1830. Previously the river was crossed by a ford, which was still used by cattle and horse-drawn vehicles after the footbridge was constructed. This wooden bridge was replaced by a brick- and stone-built Weetman's Bridge in 1887. The Trent and Mersey Canal mile post at Little Haywood is number 37.

Features and facilities

Saint Mary's Abbey
The most prominent building in Little Haywood is Saint Mary's Abbey, Colwich. This Roman Catholic abbey is home to a community of enclosed Benedictine nuns and although part of the neighbouring Colwich parish, the abbey and its grounds lie alongside the road that runs through Little Haywood.

Within the village, on land owned by Shugborough Hall, there is evidence of small-scale stone quarrying in the area known to locals as "the cliffs" or "the caves".

Pubs and shops
The village and its outlying neighbours have an active parish community; the parish council organises events such as village fetes and on a day-to-day basis the social life of the village revolves around its public houses: the 'Red Lion' and the 'Lamb and Flag'. There is no church in Little Haywood, no village green and no school. There are, however, the two pubs with the nearest general store being situated within Great Haywood.

Wall
In order to keep the workers from being idle, Talbot would make work for them in the form of features whose purpose might best be described as decorative.

J. R. R. Tolkien
The village was home to the newly married Edith Tolkien, wife of author J. R. R. Tolkien, from March 1916 to February 1917. Tolkien stayed with his wife in Cottage 1, Gipsy Green, on the Teddesley Park Estate, near the village during the winter of 1916, whilst recuperating from trench fever. The surrounding landscape of Cannock Chase was said to be an inspiration for his early literary works about Middle-earth.. At the cottage he began work on what would become The Silmarillion.

Tragic accidents at Colwich Junction
On 18 September 1986 two passenger trains collided at Colwich Junction, less than half a mile from Little Haywood, killing the driver of one of the trains and injuring 75 passengers. Several carriages of the crowded InterCity services were derailed. On 2 January 2009, a Piper Cherokee single engine light aircraft came down at Colwich junction, killing the three people on board.

See also
Listed buildings in Colwich, Staffordshire

References

External links

A map of Little Haywood dating from 1887
The Staffordshire History Home Page

Borough of Stafford
Villages in Staffordshire